Saint-François-du-Lac is a community in the Nicolet-Yamaska Regional County Municipality of Quebec, Canada. The population as of the Canada 2011 Census was 1,957. It is located at the confluence of the Saint Lawrence and Saint-François rivers, at the edge of Lac Saint-Pierre (hence its name, "Saint-François of the lake").

Saint-François-du-Lac faces the town of Pierreville across the Saint-François River. Quebec routes 132 and 143 intersect in the community and connect it to others.

History
Saint-François-du-Lac was founded as a French Jesuit mission village for converted Abenaki and other native peoples during the colonial years.  The community was called St.-Francois-de-Sales, after a French saint, or Odanak, the Abenaki name. Indians in the community included Abenaki and refugees from other tribes and the wars with English colonists in eastern New England. Particularly in the aftermath of King Philip's War, which devastated southern coastal tribes, warriors from Odanak participated in retaliation in many raids against English colonial settlements, sometimes in alliance with French military leaders. They brought back English captives, particularly women and children, who were sometimes ransomed to raise money, or adopted by the Abenaki or Mohawk in mission villages near Montreal. One of the first seigneurs of Saint-François-du-Lac was Jean Crevier de Saint-François, who purchased the seigneury from his brother-in-law Pierre Boucher in 1673.

Father Rale's War 

This was one name for the armed engagements between New England settlements of mostly English colonists and the Wabanaki Confederacy (specifically the Mi'kmaq, Maliseet, and Abenaki), who were allied with New France. Indians fought from mission villages established by French priests along the northern border, which was in dispute between New England and New France through much of the 18th century.

Raids on Arrowsic (1722 and 1723) 
During Father Rale's War, on September 10, 1722, some 400 or 500 St. Francis (Odanak, Quebec) and Mi'kmaq warriors attacked Arrowsic, Maine, in conjunction with Father Rale and Abenaki forces from Norridgewock, Maine.

In the summer of 1723, the Norridgewock and 250 Indian allies from St. Francis conducted a second attack against Arrowsic. After Father Rale's War, Abenaki fled to St. Francis from Norridgewock.

Seven Years' War
During the Seven Years' War (also known as the French and Indian War in North America), the village and buildings of St. Francis were burned in an attack by Rogers' Rangers on October 4, 1759. This irregular British provincial force raided in Quebec. As a result of its defeat by Great Britain in this war, France ceded its territory in New France and east of the Mississippi River to Great Britain.

After the devastation of the warfare, First Nations people gradually settled again in this area. The English referred to the village as St. Francis for many years.

Years later Canada designated Odanak as an Indian reserve for Abenaki, next to the majority French-Canadian village of Saint-Francois-du-Lac, which historic name was restored. In the late 20th century, the national government made French an official language in the entire nation and further recognized ethnic French and Québecois interests.

Demographics

Population
Population trend:

(+) Amalgamation of the Parish and the Village of Saint-François-du-Lac on December 31, 1997.

Language
Mother tongue language (2006)

See also
List of municipalities in Quebec
Municipal history of Quebec

References

Gill family residents of St Francis (reference only)
St. Francois de Sales (St. Francis Mission)

External links

(Google Maps)

Communities in Centre-du-Québec
Municipalities in Quebec
Incorporated places in Centre-du-Québec
Quebec populated places on the Saint Lawrence River
Catholic missions of New France
Nicolet-Yamaska Regional County Municipality